Herman Hotchkiss (1 July 1765 – 20 February 1836) was an early settler of East Haven, Connecticut and is credited as founder of Fair Haven, Connecticut.  This is not because he discovered it, which was achieved by other Europeans in 1639, but because he made numerous investments which ultimately led to its growth.

Records from North Congregational Church in New Haven, Connecticut list a marriage between Herman Hotchkiss and Elizabeth Ford on 28 July 1793.

In 1806 he built a two-story dwelling (the first permanent house in the community), barn and horsesheds in Fair Haven.  Recognizing commercial potential, Hotchkiss and his business partner James Barnes purchased land from Nathaniel Granniss in 1811 at both sides of the planned Dragon Bridge.  Hotchkiss and Barnes constructed wharves, a mercantile store, a tavern, and hotel.  He continued buying land in the area up to his death in February 1836.

Hotchkiss was buried at Fair Haven Union Cemetery.

References

1765 births
1836 deaths
History of New Haven, Connecticut
Burials in Connecticut
Settlers of Connecticut
American city founders
People from East Haven, Connecticut